Offside is a minor foul in gridiron football caused when a player crosses the line of scrimmage ahead of the snap of the ball. The penalty associated with the infraction is the advancing of the ball five yards and a replay of the down.

History

Definition
In gridiron football, offside is a foul in which a player is on the wrong side of the line of scrimmage when the ball is snapped. The foul occurs simultaneously with the snap.

Offside is committed by the defense when a defensive player crosses the line of scrimmage before the ball is snapped. In the case of an offside foul, play is not stopped, and the foul is announced at the conclusion of the play, giving the offense a free play because the non-offending team can choose whether to accept the result of the play or accept the five yards gained by the penalty.

Although an offside foul is usually committed by the defense, if an offensive player lines up in the neutral zone, an offside foul will be called against the offense.

Penalty

Prior to 1925, a call of offside against a defensive unit brought with it an automatic first down in addition to a five-yard advancement of the ball for the offense. However, a December 1924 meeting of the Football Coaches' Association of America spurred a change of rules for the 1925 season eliminating the provision for an automatic first down, while leaving the five yard penalty intact.

The penalty for violation remains five yards at most levels of professional and amateur play.

See also
Encroachment (gridiron football)

References

Gridiron football penalties
American